The 1928 season was the Chicago Bears' 9th in the National Football League. The team was unable to improve on their 9–3–2 record from 1927 and finished with a 7–5–1 record under head coach George Halas, earning them a fifth-place finish in the team standings, their worst record to date. The season had its high points, including two shutout wins over the crosstown rival Chicago Cardinals, a shutout win over the defending champion New York Giants, and convincing victories over Frankford, Dayton, and Pottsville. However, two losses each to Detroit and the Green Bay Packers made 1928 a disappointment to the normally contending Bears. Chicago's problem was that the old guard was aging with Joey Sternaman, Paddy Driscoll, and George Halas, who also played, were now in their early 30s. There was not enough new talent was on the team to be competitive. Also, the Bears were now faced with an equal number of away games as at home, whereas in the early 1920s almost all their games were at home as they drew much larger crowds than most other teams. The pace of playing 3 games in 8 days around Thanksgiving was at the time a standard practice.  The Thanksgiving game was not a substitute for the Sunday game but just an extra game which also hurt the veteran Bears down the stretch as in previous years. 
Joe Sternaman and William Senn starred on offense with 4 and 5 touchdowns each. Sternaman also shared kicking duties with Driscoll. The passing game became more important and the Bears scored 11 touchdowns via the air, versus 13 on the ground. This was a league-wide trend, foreshadowing the ascendancy of Don Hutson and Sammy Baugh of the 1930s.

Future Hall of Fame players
Paddy Driscoll, back
George Halas, end
Link Lyman, tackle
George Trafton, center

Other leading players
William Senn, back
Ed Sternaman, back
Joe Sternaman, quarterback
Laurie Walquist, quarterback

Players departed from 1927
Ed Healey, tackle (retired)

Schedule

Standings

References

Chicago Bears
Chicago Bears seasons
Chicago Bears